Rodson Dedy Tojosoa (born 7 January 1974) is a Madagascar international footballer.

Career
Rodson Dedy Tojosoa was played for the AS Fortior and Curepipe Starlight SC.

Honours
Mauritian League: 3
2007, 2008, 2009
Mauritian Cup: 2
2006, 2008.
Mauritian Republic Cup: 2
2007, 2008.

References

1974 births
Living people
Association football midfielders
Madagascar international footballers
Malagasy expatriate footballers
Malagasy footballers
AS Fortior players
Expatriate footballers in Mauritius
Curepipe Starlight SC players
Mauritian Premier League players
Malagasy expatriate sportspeople in Mauritius